Goranxi is a settlement in the former Dropull i Poshtëm municipality, Gjirokastër County, southern Albania. At the 2015 local government reform it became part of the municipality Dropull. It is within the larger Dropull region.

Demographics
In the Ottoman tax registry of 1520, Kalogoranxi (Gornaxi e Poshtme) appears as having 151 households. In the same Ottoman register the Albanian anthroponyms Gjon and Gjin are frequently attested, as per. ex. : Gjon Papadopulo, Gjon Bazhani, Gjon Deda, Gjon Kondi, Gjin Bazhani (twice), Gjin Ruvini, Gjin Kostandini, Gjin Nako, Gjin Andoni. However here, the rendering Jani is more frequent. Other Albanian anthroponyms such as Deda, Laluç and Kol also appear.

It is inhabited by members of the Greek minority.

Culture

Religion 
Orthodox complexes within Goranxi:
 Church of St. Athanasius (Ναός Αγίου Αθανασίου, Kisha e Shën Thanasit)
 Monastery of St. Mary (Μοναστήρι της Παναγιάς, Manastiri i Shën Mërisë) - Declared a "Cultural Monument" (Monumente kulturore) in 1963.

Gallery

References 

Populated places in Dropull
Greek communities in Albania
Villages in Gjirokastër County